The 2005 Nicky Rackard Cup final was a hurling match played at Croke Park on 21 August 2005 to determine the winners of the 2005 Nicky Rackard Cup, the inaugural season of the Nicky Rackard Cup, a tournament organised by the Gaelic Athletic Association for the third tier hurling teams. The final was contested by London of Britain and Louth of Leinster, with London winning by 5-8 to 1-5.

The Nicky Rackard Cup final between London and Louth was a unique occasion as it was the very first championship meeting between the two teams.

The final was played as a curtain-raiser to the All-Ireland semi-final between Galway and Kilkenny.

Despite Louth getting the opening two scores of the game, the first of which came from Gerard Smith after only 13 seconds, London soon asserted themselves. They shot five wides in the first six minutes before Michael Harding finally put them on the board from a 65. In the 14th minute London rocked Louth with two goals in a minute, to surge into a 2-2 to 0-2 lead. The first goal came when Barry Shorthall caught Brian Foley's sideline cut before running and finishing unchallenged, and that was followed by a Kevin McMullan tap-in after Louth 'keeper Stephen Smith failed to deal with Jim Ryan's long ball. The rest of the half was a somewhat scrappy affair, but Louth at least managed to remain competitive, as London went in at the break leading 2-4 to 0-5.

The first 18 minutes of the second half yielded just one point from Dave Bourke. Gerard Smith seemed to throw the game wide open again when he netted a scrappy effort for Louth, but it proved to be a false dawn as London knocked in three goals before the end, from Kevin McMullan, Sean Quinn and Bourke.

By winning the Nicky Rackard Cup final, London became the first team to have won the All-Ireland Senior Hurling Championship and Rackard Cup titles. They remain the only winners of both championships.

Match

Details

References

Nicky Rackard Cup Final
London county hurling team matches
Louth county hurling team matches
Nicky Rackard Cup Finals